Arni Thorvaldsson (born 5 July 1984) is an alpine skier from Iceland.  He competed for Iceland at the 2010 Winter Olympics.

Arni has been member of the Icelandic national team since 2006

competed for Iceland in FIS Alpine World Ski Championships 2009.

References

External links

1984 births
Living people
Arni Thorvaldsson
Arni Thorvaldsson
Alpine skiers at the 2010 Winter Olympics
21st-century Icelandic people